Bor-Forpost is a rural locality (a selo) and the administrative center of Bor-Forpostovsky Selsoviet of Volchikhinsky District, Altai Krai, Russia. The population was 843 as of 2016. It was founded in 1656. There are 12 streets.

Geography 
Bor-Forpost is located 25 km southwest of Volchikha (the district's administrative centre) by road. Ust-Volchikha is the nearest rural locality.

Ethnicity 
The village is inhabited by Russians and others.

References 

Rural localities in Volchikhinsky District